Autumn Aurora is the second album by Ukrainian black metal band Drudkh, released in 2004. It is the first Drudkh album to incorporate synthesizers and, as with its predecessor, its lyrics have never been released.

Some releases of Autumn Aurora have "Summoning the Rain" and "Glare of Autumn" combined as a single track.
The album has been re-released on November 9, 2009, by Season of Mist, featuring a remastered sound and a new album artwork.

Autumn Aurora was a strong critical success, and was chosen as the best album of the year by Chronicles of Chaos web-zine.

Most releases of the album have the titles only in English, but the iTunes release uses both English and Ukrainian language titles.

Track listing

Personnel
 Roman Saenko – guitars, bass
 Thurios – vocals, keyboards
 Amorth – keyboards

Guest musicians
 Yuriy Sinitsky – drums

References

External links
Review at BestBlackMetalAlbums.com
Album at Encyclopaedia Metallum

2004 albums
Drudkh albums
Season of Mist albums